Slaughter on Tenth Avenue is a 1957 American film noir crime film directed by Arnold Laven and starring Richard Egan, Jan Sterling, Dan Duryea, Julie Adams.

The film is a story of crime on New York's waterfront. It is based on the non-fiction book The Man Who Rocked the Boat, an autobiography by William Keating, played by Egan in the film. The book chronicles Keating's experiences as an assistant district attorney and as counsel to the New York City Anti-Crime Committee. In the portion of the book depicted in the film, Keating pursued a murder prosecution for a waterfront hit despite widespread corruption that stretched all the way into the district attorney's office.

The title comes from the Richard Rodgers ballet of the same name, which was featured in the 1936 play On Your Toes. The plot line of the movie has no relation to the play, but the composition by Rodgers is indeed heard in the film, in an adaptation by Herschel Burke Gilbert (under the direction of music supervisor Joseph Gershenson) that was praised as "magnificent".

Plot
Thugs working for union boss Al Dahlke ambush and shoot Solly Pitts, an honest man who hires longshoremen on the docks. Solly is wounded and hospitalized, looked after by wife Madge, who trusts Lt. Tony Vosnick to see that justice is done.

The district attorney, Howard Rysdale, turns over the investigation to a relative novice, Bill Keating. As his marriage to fiancee Daisy Pauly draws near, Keating tries in vain to get longshoremen to speak with him about activities on the docks. An intermediary tries to persuade Keating to collude with Dahlke, who issues vague threats after Bill rejects him.

Witnesses are intimidated and discredited by attorney John Jacob Masters in court, and Bill and Daisy receive an anonymous death threat on their wedding day. Keating goes to the docks for a direct confrontation with Dahlke's men and triggers a near-riot. As the dust settles, the men hear on the radio that Solly's attackers have been found guilty.

Cast
 Richard Egan as William Keating
 Jan Sterling as Madge Pitts
 Dan Duryea as John Jacob Masters
 Julie Adams as Dee
 Walter Matthau as Al Dahlke
 Charles McGraw as Lt. Anthony Vosnick
 Sam Levene as Howard Rysdale
 Mickey Shaughnessy as Solly Pitts
 Harry Bellaver as Benjy Karp
 Nick Dennis as Midget 
 Joe Downing as Eddie 'Cockeye' Cook 
 Ned Wever as Captain Sid Wallace 
 Billy M. Greene as "Monk" Mohler 
 John McNamara as Judge 
 Amzie Strickland as Mrs. Cavanagh
 Mickey Hargitay as Big John

See also
 List of American films of 1957

References

External links

1957 films
1957 crime drama films
American black-and-white films
American crime drama films
Films based on non-fiction books
Films directed by Arnold Laven
Films scored by Herschel Burke Gilbert
Films set in New York City
Films shot in New York City
Universal Pictures films
1950s English-language films
1950s American films